Rick Hemmink (born 14 February 1993) is a Dutch professional footballer who plays as a attacking midfielder for Excelsior '31.

Club career
He made his professional debut in the Eerste Divisie for Jong Twente on 30 November 2013 in a game against Sparta Rotterdam.

References

External links
 
 

1993 births
People from Vriezenveen
Living people
Dutch footballers
Eerste Divisie players
Tweede Divisie players
Achilles '29 players
Association football midfielders
Footballers from Overijssel
Jong FC Twente players